Jack Sutton (9 December 1921 – 6 July 1998) was  a former Australian rules footballer who played with Footscray in the Victorian Football League (VFL).

Notes

External links 

1921 births
1998 deaths
Australian rules footballers from Victoria (Australia)
Western Bulldogs players